Biarritz Aquarium, also known as le Musée de la Mer (Museum of the Sea), is an aquarium in Biarritz. The building, in art deco style, was opened in 1933. It went through the first renovation in 1992 to add an important collection of marine animals. An extension was added between 2009 and 2011 which doubled the visiting area and added more tanks, at the expense of space for birds.

The aquarium 
The museum is laid out across 4 floors:
 various tanks of marine life from the Bay of Biscay
 information on fishing, cetaceans, and the history of whaling, as well as temporary exhibits
 the turtle tank the underwater part of the seal tank
 the terrace and the outdoor part of the seal tank, then with the extensions, includes the north Atlantic tanks, the Caribbean exhibit, the Indo-Pacific exhibit (including the shark tank), and the gift shop

Gallery

References

External links

Aquaria in France
Organizations based in Nouvelle-Aquitaine
Biarritz
1933 establishments in France
Buildings and structures in Pyrénées-Atlantiques
Buildings and structures completed in 1933
20th-century architecture in France